Sevastopolsky (masculine), Sevastopolskaya (feminine), or Sevastopolskoye (neuter) may refer to:
Sevastopolskaya (Moscow Metro), a station on the Serpukhovsko-Timiryazevskaya Line
Sevastopolskaya (rural locality), a rural locality (a stanitsa) in Maykopsky District of the Republic of Adygea, Russia
Sevastopolsky District, one of the historical administrative divisions of Moscow, Russia

See also
Dasha from Sevastopol (Dasha Sevastopolskaya) (1836–1892), Russian nurse during the siege of Sevastopol
Sevastopolsky Vals, a song composed by Konstantin Listov (1900–1983)